Hu Zhangbao (born 5 April 1963) is a Chinese former basketball player who competed in the 1984 Summer Olympics.

References

External links 
 

1963 births
Living people
Chinese men's basketball players
Olympic basketball players of China
Basketball players at the 1984 Summer Olympics
Place of birth missing (living people)